Haight Street is the principal street in San Francisco's Haight-Ashbury district, also known as the Upper Haight due to its elevation. The street stretches from Market Street, through the Lower Haight neighborhood, to Stanyan Street in the Upper Haight, at Golden Gate Park.  In most blocks it is residential, but in the Upper and Lower Haight it is also a neighborhood shopping street, with residences above the ground floor shops.  It is named after California pioneer and exchange banker Henry Haight (1820–1869).

Structures and places fronting on Haight Street

 Booksmith
 Bound Together Bookstore Collective
 Buena Vista Park
 Chinese Immersion School at De Avila
 Diggers (theater)
 The Red Victorian

References

Streets in San Francisco
Haight-Ashbury, San Francisco
Shopping districts and streets in the United States